Stanisław Marcin Bukowiec (born November 8th 1972 in Bochnia) is a Polish journalist, publisher, activist, politician, and member of the IX Sejm from the 15th constituency (Tarnów).

From 1998 to 2005 town councilor of Bochnia, from 2005 to 2014 mayor of that town. In 2018 he was elected to the sejmik of the Lesser Poland Voivodeship. He was elected to Sejm in the 2019 Polish Parliamentary elections from the lists of Law and Justice with 12,449 votes.

He is a member of the Agreement political party, having earlier been an activist in Poland Together.  

He is married and has two children.

References 

21st-century Polish politicians
Living people
1972 births
People from Bochnia
Members of the Polish Sejm 2019–2023